The men's 50 metre rifle three positions competition at the 2004 Summer Olympics was held on 22 August at the Markópoulo Olympic Shooting Centre near Athens, Greece.

The event consisted of two rounds: a qualifier and a final. In the qualifier, each shooter fired 120 shots with a .22 Long Rifle at 50 metres distance. 40 shots were fired each from the standing, kneeling, and prone positions. Scores for each shot were in increments of 1, with a maximum score of 10.

The top 8 shooters in the qualifying round moved on to the final round. There, they fired an additional 10 shots, all from the standing position. These shots scored in increments of .1, with a maximum score of 10.9. The total score from all 130 shots was used to determine the final ranking.

23-year-old U.S. shooter Matthew Emmons commanded his lead throughout the rifle three positions finale for a possible historic small-bore double at these Games, until he aimed at the wrong target on his final shot, as a result of a crossfire and a nullified score, that stumbled him down the leaderboard to a disastrous eighth with 1257.4. Emmons' costly mistake thereby upgraded Chinese shooter Jia Zhanbo to an Olympic gold with a score of 1264.5. The silver medal was awarded to Emmons' fellow marksman Michael Anti at 1263.1, while Austria's Christian Planer, whose target Emmons hit, held off a ferocious challenge from Slovenia's world record holder and defending Olympic champion Rajmond Debevec by a thin 0.2-point margin to take the bronze at 1262.8.

Records
Prior to this competition, the existing world and Olympic records were as follows.

Qualification round

Prone position

Standing position

Kneeling position

Combined results

Final

References

External links
Official Results

Men's 50 m Rifle Three Positions
Men's 050m 3 positions 2004
Men's events at the 2004 Summer Olympics